Suraj Musah (born 27 May 2001) is a Ghanaian footballer who currently plays as a defender for Ghana Premier League side WAFA.

Career 
Musah started his career with West African Football Academy, he was promoted to the senior team in May 2020. He was named on the club's squad list for the 2020–21 season. On 4 April 2021, he made his debut and played the full 90 minutes in a goalless draw against King Faisal Babes. He went on to start the following two matches, 1–0 win over Bechem United and 1–0 loss against Elmina Sharks.

References

External links 

 

Living people
2001 births
Association football defenders
Ghanaian footballers
West African Football Academy players
Ghana Premier League players